Cover Magazine may refer to:

Cover Magazine (album), a 2001 album by the American band Giant Sand
Cover Magazine (publication), also called Cover Magazine, the Underground National, was a New York City arts monthly publication

See also
Cover (disambiguation)